Ernest Shurtleff Holmes (January 21, 1887 – April 7, 1960) was an American New Thought writer, teacher, and leader. He was the founder of a spiritual movement known as Religious Science, part of the greater New Thought movement, whose spiritual philosophy is known as "The Science of Mind." He was the author of The Science of Mind and numerous other metaphysical books, and the founder of Science of Mind magazine, in continuous publication since 1927. His books remain in print, and the principles he taught as "Science of Mind" have inspired and influenced many generations of metaphysical students and teachers. Holmes had previously studied another New Thought teaching, Divine Science, and was an ordained Divine Science Minister. His influence beyond New Thought can be seen in the self-help movement.

Biography 
Holmes was born January 21, 1887, in Lincoln, Maine, to a poor family. He was the son of Anna Columbia (Heath) and William Nelson Holmes. He left school and his family in Maine for Boston at the age of 15. From 1908 to 1910 he worked in a store to pay for his tuition at the Leland Powers School of Expression in Boston. There he was introduced to Mary Baker Eddy's Science and Health, as well as Christian Science.

In 1912 Holmes joined his brother Fenwicke in Venice, California. In addition to taking up a job with the city government, Holmes and his brother, a Congregationalist minister, studied the writings of Thomas Troward, Ralph Waldo Emerson, William Walker Atkinson, and Christian D. Larson.

In 1927 Holmes married Hazel Durkee Foster. She died in 1957. He died on April 7, 1960.

Religious Science/Science of Mind 

After leading small private meetings throughout the city, in 1916 Holmes was invited to speak at the Metaphysical Library in Los Angeles. This led him to repeat engagements, and on a nationwide tour. In 1919 he published his first book, The Creative Mind, and after almost a decade of touring, Holmes committed to remaining in the L.A. area to complete his major work, The Science of Mind. It was published in 1926.

That year Holmes started speaking each Sunday morning in a theatre in the Ambassador Hotel that seated 625. In November 1927, they moved to the 1,295-seat Ebell Theatre. Subsequently, Holmes' lectures continued moving to ever-larger spaces, including the Biltmore Hotel, and the Wiltern Theatre, which seats more than 2800. In February 1927, Holmes incorporated the Institute of Religious Science and School of Philosophy, Inc., and later that year he began publishing Science of Mind magazine. In 1935 he reincorporated his organization as the Institute of Religious Science and philosophy, and in 1954 it was reestablished again as a religious organization called the Church of Religious Science.

Today his Science of Mind/Religious Science teachings are continued by the Centers for Spiritual Living, the Affiliated New Thought Network, the Global Religious Science Ministries, Independent Religious Science ministries, and other organizations.  In 2015, his books Creative Mind and Creative Mind and Success were narrated by Hillary Hawkins and published in audiobook form.

Philosophy 
Holmes taught New Thought in a Christian context in his church. The primary teaching of New Thought is that physical form is created by a Universal Mind, or God, which manifests—or literally reflects—the dominant belief system of all living persons.  In his book, The Science of Mind, Holmes described this God-force as follows: 

Holmes argued that human beings have access to the power of this Universal Mind by directing their thoughts—in particular, their beliefs about the present or the future.  In his book, he described this as follows:  

In his book, The Science of Mind, Holmes explains how it is possible to direct this power by controlling one's thoughts.  A sustained belief in a particular outcome will invariably create that outcome.  In other words, good events proceed from a belief in good.  Evil events proceed from a belief in evil.  In The Science of Mind, Holmes emphasized the importance of only focusing on good:  

To get results, Holmes emphasized that it was necessary to think one specific thought, with complete certainty.  If one is continually thinking different thoughts, the Universal Mind will not have a dominant belief that it can manifest, or create, in the physical world.  Holmes explained this idea as follows, in his book, Creative Mind:

Statement of Beliefs 
In the 1920s, Holmes published the following statement of beliefs:

Through his research, Holmes created a "structure of concepts" based on the religions and philosophies of human history, sometimes correlating his findings with the then-emerging "new" physics. He named the teaching a science because he believed that its principles were scientifically provable in practice. He wrote, "I would rather see a student of this Science prove its Principle than to have him repeat all the words of wisdom that have ever been uttered."

Holmes ultimately came to believe in a "core concept" – what he saw as a "Golden thread of truth" that ran through all of the world's religions as well as in science and philosophy.

Recognition 
Holmes received a variety of recognitions for his work. In 1945, he was awarded the honorary degree of Doctor of Philosophy by Andhra University in India. The California College of Medicine, and the Foundation Academic University of Spiritual Understanding in Venice, Italy, awarded him a Doctor of Letters. In 1942, he was bestowed with the Cross of the Commander of the Grand Humanitarian Prize of Belgium, and in 1944 he was named an honorary member of the Eugene Field Society.

Bibliography
 
 Creative Mind and Success. 1922.

 This Thing Called You. Los Angeles: Tarcher. 2007.
 Living the Science of Mind. Camarillo, California: DeVorss & Company. 1991.
 The Hidden Power of the Bible. Los Angeles: Tarcher. 2006. (Originally published in 1926 as The Bible in Light of Science of Mind.)
 365 Science of Mind: A Year of Daily Wisdom from Ernest Holmes. Los Angeles: Tarcher. 2007.
 How to Change Your Life: An Inspirational, Life-Changing Classic from the Ernest Holmes Library. Deerfield Beach, Florida: HCI. 1999.
 Prayer: How to Pray Effectively. Los Angeles: Tarcher. 2007
 Love and Law. Los Angeles: Tarcher. 2004

See also

 Uell Stanley Andersen
 Raymond Charles Barker
 Joseph Sieber Benner
 Emmet Fox
 Stuart Grayson
 Hillary Hawkins
 Louise Hay
 Fenwicke Holmes
 Emma Curtis Hopkins
 A. K. Mozumdar
 Florence Scovel Shinn
 List of New Thought denominations and independent centers

References

Biographies 
 Armor, R. C., R. Llast and A. Vergara (2000), That was Ernest: The story of Ernest Holmes and the Religious Science movement. DeVorss Publications.
 Holmes, F. L. (1970), Ernest Holmes: His life and times. Dodd and Mead Publishers.

External links
 
 Ernest Holmes
 "Creative Mind" by Ernest Shurtleff Holmes
 "The Science of Mind" by Ernest Shurtleff Holmes
 
 

1887 births
1960 deaths
20th-century American writers
American metaphysics writers
American spiritual teachers
American spiritual writers
American spiritualists
Divine Science clergy
New Thought writers
People from Lincoln, Maine
Religious Science clergy